The term cat tapeworm may refer to:
 Dipylidium caninum, a tapeworm often infesting domestic dogs and cats whose intermediate host is parasitic fleas
 Taenia taeniaeformis, a similar worm whose intermediate host is rodents and lagomorphs.

Animal common name disambiguation pages